The Job Opportunities and Basic Skills Training program (JOBS) was a welfare-to-work program created by the Family Support Act of 1988 to replace the Work Incentive program (WIN) created by the Social Security Act Amendments of 1967.

JOBS was replaced by the Temporary Assistance for Needy Families (TANF) program in 1997 pursuant to the Personal Responsibility and Work Opportunity Reconciliation Act (PRWORA) of 1996.

References

 
 

Former United States Federal assistance programs
1988 establishments in the United States
1997 disestablishments in the United States